Ilse Pausin-Ulrich (née Pausin) (7 February 1919 – 6 August 1999) was an Austrian pair skater. With her brother Erik Pausin, she won the silver medal at the 1936 Winter Olympics at age 17. They won five consecutive silver medals (1935-1939) at the World Figure Skating Championships and three consecutive silver medals (1937-1939) at the European Figure Skating Championships. In 1939, they competed representing Nazi Germany, which swept the Worlds pairs podium that year.

Results
(with Erich Pausin)

References

 Skatabase: 1930s Worlds
 Skatabase: 1930s Europeans
 Skatabase: 1930s Olympics

External links
Ilse Pausin's profile on databaseOlympics

1919 births
1999 deaths
Austrian female pair skaters
Figure skaters at the 1936 Winter Olympics
German female pair skaters
Olympic figure skaters of Austria
Olympic silver medalists for Austria
Olympic medalists in figure skating
World Figure Skating Championships medalists
European Figure Skating Championships medalists
Medalists at the 1936 Winter Olympics